Madcap Mabel is a 2010 dramatic 35-minute short film about a guilty reporter (played by Rudy Cecera) who had helped sensationalize the scandals that damaged the career of dying silent film comedian/writer/director Mabel Normand (Penelope Lagos). The film depicts another of Charles Chaplin's leading ladies, Edna Purviance (Katie Maguire), as well as Normand's lover Mack Sennett (Ron Nummi) and young reporter Adela Rogers St. Johns (Elise Rovinsky), and was written by Cecera and directed by Dena Schumacher.

Cast

References

External links
 

2010 films
2010s English-language films